Sikha-Shahi is used to denote the high-handedness of a ruler. The term originated during the rule of Maharaja Ranjit Singh of the Sikh Empire in Punjab, which stretched from the Kashmir valley to the mouth of the Khyber Pass. About 70 per cent of the subjects of the Sikh ruler were Muslim.
Allegedly, during the Sikh period in Lahore, curb to religious freedom and economic suppression were imposed on Muslim subjects. The Sikh rule was dubbed ‘Sikha-Shahi’ by the aggrieved Muslim elite. The phrase now refers to the rule of a monarchy or unfavourable court orders  in Pakistan, especially in the Punjab province.

See also
 Battle of Shopian
 Sikh period in Lahore
 Treaty of Amritsar (1846)
 Religious discrimination in Pakistan
 Chhota Ghallughara
 Vadda Ghalughara
 Military coups in Pakistan
 Sikh Empire
 Islam and Sikhism

Notes

Pakistani words and phrases
Political terminology in Pakistan
Punjab, Pakistan
Punjabi words and phrases
Sikh Empire